Andrew Francis McDonell (24 August 1882 – 29 September 1942) was an Australian rules footballer who played for the South Melbourne Football Club in the Victorian Football League (VFL).

Talents 
AFL: 1,089th player to appear, 9,106th most games played, 8,335th most goals kicked. South Melbourne: 167th player to appear, 954th most games played, 871st most goals kicked.

 Senior clubs- South Melbourne
Age at first & last AFL game-   First game: 22y 360d                                                      Last game: 23y 296d

References

External links 

https://australianfootball.com/players/player/andy%2Bmcdonell/2062

1882 births
1942 deaths
Australian rules footballers from Melbourne
Sydney Swans players
People from Albert Park, Victoria